Raphaël Lapeire (born 30 December 1944 in Izegem) is a Belgian former football midfielder. He was what would be now considered as a box-to-box player.

Lapeire started playing football at the age of 10, with his local team KFC Izegem. At age 25, he moved to Cercle Brugge, where he would stay five seasons. He made his green and black debut against SK Roeselare, a 3–0 home win with Lapeire scoring twice. In his first season with Cercle, he became second division champions and even top scorer of the team, despite being a midfielder. He would repeat this in the 1972-73 season.

Lapeire left Cercle Brugge after the 1974-75 season, and never returned at the highest level. His last teams were SC Menen, Eendracht Wervik and Club Roeselare.

External links
Raf Lapeire at Cerclemuseum.be 

1944 births
Living people
People from Izegem
Belgian footballers
Association football midfielders
Cercle Brugge K.S.V. players
Belgian Pro League players
Challenger Pro League players
Footballers from West Flanders